The Secret Policeman's Ball 2012 was the title of the show staged as a benefit for human rights organization Amnesty International at New York City's Radio City Music Hall on 4 March 2012, it was one of the long-running series of similar Amnesty benefits.

Like its predecessors in 2006 and 2008, the show title was a reprise of the title of the 1979 Amnesty benefit show, The Secret Policeman's Ball, which heralded the organization's breakthrough in public awareness and fund-raising.  To celebrate the fiftieth anniversary of Amnesty International, the show took place in the United States for the first time on March 4, 2012 at Radio City Music Hall in New York City, instead of its usual location in London.

Content
The show was produced by James Serafinowicz and featured a mix of prominent comedians from Britain and the United States. After a taped introduction by Archbishop Desmond Tutu, the comedy lineup included:
 
 Jon Stewart
 Russell Brand
 Eddie Izzard
 Reggie Watts
 Ben Stiller
 Peter Serafinowicz
 Fred Armisen
 Kristen Wiig
 Seth Meyers
 Jason Sudeikis 
 Bobby Moynihan
 Jay Pharoah
 Taran Killam 
 Rachel Dratch
 Catherine Tate
 David Cross
 Bob Odenkirk
 Hannibal Buress
 Sarah Silverman
 Paul Rudd
 Matt Berry
 John Oliver
 Rashida Jones
 Chris O'Dowd
 David Walliams
 Jimmy Carr
 Noel Fielding
 Micky Flanagan
 Jack Whitehall
 Tim Roth
 Bill Hader (as Julian Assange)
 Rex Lee (as Kim Jong-un)
 John van der Put (as Piff the Magic Dragon)

There was a cameo appearance by Richard Branson, Liam Neeson introduced formerly imprisoned Burmese comedian and political activist Zarganar.

The musical lineup consisted of Mumford & Sons, Reggie Watts with Peter Serafinowicz, and a concluding set by Coldplay.

Additionally, Beavis and Butt-head appeared in an animated sequence and former Monty Python members Michael Palin, Eric Idle, and Terry Jones appeared in pre-recorded video segments explaining comedically why they were not there.  At several moments in the show, Statler and Waldorf from the Muppets commented on the event and spoke to performers from a balcony.

Aziz Ansari, The Antics, Maya Rudolph and Stephen Colbert had been rumoured to appear but ultimately did not do so.

The event was streamed live on Epix. Peter Serafinowicz provided the voice of the announcer. It was later shown on Channel 4 in the UK on 9 March 2012, with extra behind the scenes interviews with some of the performers. 

The show was presented by Jimmy Carr, providing voice-overs, as well as recorded links out of ads by various comedians.

References

External links
Official Event Website

2012 in New York City
American comedy
Amnesty International
British comedy
Radio City Music Hall
March 2012 events in the United States